Moffitt Austin (23 October 1873 – 21 February 1942) was an Australian cricketer. He played in two first-class matches for Queensland in 1894/95.

See also
 List of Queensland first-class cricketers

References

External links
 

1873 births
1942 deaths
Australian cricketers
Queensland cricketers
Cricketers from Sydney